2015 Georgian Super Cup was a Georgian football match that was played on 25 August 2015 between the champions of 2014–15 Umaglesi Liga, Dila Gori, and the winner of the 2014–15 Georgian Cup, Dinamo Tbilisi.

Match details

See also
2014–15 Umaglesi Liga
2014–15 Georgian Cup

References

2015
FC Dila Gori
FC Dinamo Tbilisi matches
Supercup
August 2015 sports events in Europe